The 1934 Centre Colonels football team was an American football team that represented Centre College as a member of the Dixie Conference and the Southern Intercollegiate Athletic Association (SIAA) in the 1934 college football season. Led by Ed Kubale in his seventh season as head coach, the team compiled an overall record of 5–5 and with a mark of 1–1 in Dixie Conference play and 4–1 against SIAA competition.

Schedule

References

Centre
Centre
Centre Colonels football seasons
Centre Colonels football